St. Mary Parish School Board is a school district headquartered in unincorporated St. Mary Parish, Louisiana, United States.

The district serves St. Mary Parish.

School board Members

 District 1 - Joseph C. Foulcard Jr. (Democrat)
 District 2 - Tammie L. Moore (Democrat)
 District 3 - Kenneth "Kenny" Alfred (Republican) (Board President)
 District 4 - Debra Roberson Jones (Democrat) 
 District 5 - Ginger S. Griffin (No Party)
 District 6 - Marilyn P. La Salle (Democrat) (Board Vice-President)
 District 7 - Wayne Deslatte (No Party)
 District 8 - Michael E. Taylor (No Party) 
 District 9 - Alaina Black (Republican)
 District 10 - Dwight Barbier (No Party)
 District 11 - Roland H. Verrett (Democrat)

 Superintendent - Dr. Teresa T. Bagwell (2019-2023)

Former Superintendents
 Leonard "Lenny" Armato (2015-2019)
 Dr. Donald Aguillard (2004-2015)
 Lloyd Dressel (1998-2004)
 Stephen Gauthier (1993-1998)
 Edward Payton Jr. (1990-1993)
 Dr. Ronald Perry (1987-1990)
 Evans J. Medine (1970-1987)

School uniforms
Students are required to wear school uniforms.

Schools

PreK-12 schools
 Centerville School (Centerville)

High schools
 Berwick High School (Berwick)
 Franklin Senior High School  (Franklin)
 Morgan City High School  (Morgan City)
 Patterson High School (Patterson)
 West St. Mary High School  (Baldwin)

5-8 schools
 Patterson Junior High School (Patterson)

6-8 schools
 Berwick Junior High School (Berwick)
 B. Edward Boudreaux Middle School (Baldwin)
 Franklin Junior High School (Franklin)
 Morgan City Junior High School (Morgan City)

PreK-5 schools
 J. S. Aucoin Elementary School (Ameilia)
 W. P. Foster Elementary School (Franklin)
 J. B. Maitland Elementary School (Morgan City)
 M. E. Norman Elementary School (Morgan City)
 Raintree Elementary School (Baldwin)
 Wyandotte Elementary School (Morgan City)
 Bayou Vista Elementary School (Bayou Vista)
 LaGrange Elementary School (Franklin)

PreK-4 schools
 Hattie A. Watts Elementary School (Patterson)

Alternative schools
 St. Mary Parish Alternative School (Verdunville)

References

External links
 St. Mary Parish School Board

School districts in Louisiana
Education in St. Mary Parish, Louisiana